Balkan Bulgarian Airlines Flight 307 was a scheduled international passenger flight from Sofia to Moscow that crashed on its final approach to the Sheremetyevo Airport in Moscow on March 3, 1973. All 25 passengers and crew on board were killed in the crash.

Aircraft 
The aircraft involved was an Ilyushin Il-18V, registration LZ-BEM with the manufacturer's serial number 182005602. The aircraft first flew in 1962.

Description of the accident
The aircraft was completing an international scheduled passenger flight from Sofia to Moscow when, on its second landing attempt after a missed approach, it started to lose altitude and nosedived shortly thereafter. The aircraft crashed into the ground, disintegrated, and caught fire. There were no survivors among the  passengers and seven crew members on board. The accident marked the  loss of an Ilyushin Il-18 and was also the  worst accident involving the type at the time of the accident. , the event is the  deadliest one involving an Il-18.

Icing was later determined as the possible cause of the accident.

References

Aviation accidents and incidents in 1973
Balkan Bulgarian Airlines accidents and incidents
Aviation accidents and incidents in the Soviet Union
1973 in the Soviet Union
Bulgaria–Soviet Union relations
1973 in Bulgaria
Accidents and incidents involving the Ilyushin Il-18
March 1973 events in Europe
Airliner accidents and incidents caused by ice